Blessing and Curse is an EP by Band of Susans, released in 1987 by Trace Elements Records.

Track listing

Personnel 
Adapted from Blessing and Curse liner notes.

Band of Susans
 Susan Lyall – electric guitar, backing vocals
 Robert Poss – electric guitar, vocals, production
 Alva Rogers – vocals
 Ron Spitzer – drums
 Susan Stenger – bass guitar, backing vocals
 Susan Tallman – electric guitar

Production and additional personnel
 Bob Coulter – engineering
 Bill Hemy – engineering
 Bob Power – engineering

Release history

References

External links 
 

1987 EPs
Band of Susans albums
Blast First EPs